The Eternal Flame Falls is a small waterfall located in the Shale Creek Preserve, a section of Chestnut Ridge Park in Western New York. A small grotto at the waterfall's base emits natural gas, which can be lit to produce a small flame. This flame is visible nearly year round, although it can be extinguished and must occasionally be re-lit.

The Eternal Flame Falls were featured in the book Secret Places by Bruce Kershner and in the book What's Weird on Earth.

Recent developments
Once considered an "obscure" attraction in the region, media attention and improvements to the access trail have led to an increased number of visitors. The increased popularity of the falls has led to some negative impacts, such as an increase in litter, vandalism, pollution, and impacts on the surrounding terrain by tourists, but also fueled a successful public protest against a plan to clear a nearby forested area to install a disc golf course in 2012.  However, the disc golf course was installed just through the forest area.

Composition and source of gas
Geologists from Indiana University Bloomington and Italy's National Institute of Geophysics and Volcanology studied Eternal Flame Falls in 2013 in an effort to better understand how natural gas emitted from naturally occurring hydrocarbon seeps contribute to greenhouse gases in the atmosphere. They found that the 'macro seep' at Eternal Flame Falls had higher concentrations of ethane and propane (about 35%) than other known natural gas seeps, which typically contain a greater proportion of methane.

The researchers also noted the presence of numerous other 'micro seeps' in the area of the falls. Tectonic activity likely opened faults in the shale, allowing the gas to reach the surface.

According to one geologist involved in the 2013 study, the seep's apparent source could provide evidence for a previously unknown geologic mechanism by which natural gas is produced within shale. Typically, shale must be hot (around ) for its carbon structures to break down and form smaller natural gas molecules. However, the shale from which Eternal Flame Falls draws its gas is much cooler, in addition to being younger and shallower than typical gas-bearing shale. This may indicate that additional, as yet un-demonstrated, processes can contribute to the creation of natural gas in shale; one possibility is that a catalyst capable of breaking down shale in cooler conditions is present.

Images

See also
Naturally fueled eternal flames
List of waterfalls of New York

References

External links
Map of Eternal Flame Falls trail

Waterfalls of New York (state)
Landforms of Erie County, New York
Protected areas of Erie County, New York
Persistent natural fires